Lajas de Tolé is a corregimiento in Tolé District, Chiriquí Province, Panama. Its population as of 1990 was 906; its population as of 2000 was 850.

References

Corregimientos of Chiriquí Province